Potoxylon is a monotypic genus of evergreen trees belonging to the Laurel family, Lauraceae. Its only species, Potoxylon melagangai, is native to Borneo.

Description
Potoxylon melagangai is an evergreen tree with gray bark. Leaves are alternate, simple, leathery, with entire margins and pinnate venation. The inflorescences are grouped in axillary spikes. The flowers are bisexual and actinomorphic with six tepals in two whorls, 9 stamens in three whorls, the ovary superior and unilocular. The fruit, a berry-like drupe, is ellipsoid and dispersed by birds.

Evolutionary history
Phylogenetic analysis shows that Potoxylon diverged early from other Lauraceae. Potoxylon, like the related genus Eusideroxylon, has an evolutionary history that is difficult to resolve because of the complex geological history of its native range, which has components from both the Gondwanan and Laurasian supercontinents, and consequently it is unclear whether Potoxylon evolved on Gondwana.

References

Trees of Borneo
Lauraceae genera
Monotypic Laurales genera
Endemic flora of Borneo
Lauraceae